Zhaiya Township is a rural township in Jingzhou Miao and Dong Autonomous County, Hunan, China. It is surrounded by Wenxi Township on the north, Quyang Town on the west, Suining County on the east, and Xikou Town of Tongdao County on the south.

History
In March 1985, the Zhaiya Dong and Miao Ethnics Township was established. In July 1987 it was renamed "Zhaiya Township".

Geography
The Laoya Stream, a tributary of the Qujiang River, winds through the township.

The whole township has a mild climate and distinct seasons. It belongs to the subtropical monsoon humid climate zone. There is no heat in summer and no severe cold in winter.

Economy
The township's economy is based on nearby mineral resources and agricultural resources. Mineral resources include gold, copper, manganese and oil. Fruits include walnut and kiwifruit.

Transportation
The Provincial Highway S221 passes across the township northwest to east.

The G65 Baotou–Maoming Expressway is a northwest-southeast highway in the township.

Attractions
The Guihua Bridge is an 18th-century bridge in the township. It was built in the Qianlong period (1736–1795) of the Qing dynasty (1644–1911).

References

Townships of Huaihua
Jingzhou Miao and Dong Autonomous County